Elmsdale may refer to:

 Elmsdale, Nova Scotia, Canada
 Elmsdale, Prince Edward Island, Canada

See also

 Elmdale (disambiguation)